{{DISPLAYTITLE:C20H27N3O6}}
The molecular formula C20H27N3O6 (molar mass: 405.44 g/mol, exact mass: 405.1900 u) may refer to:

 Imidapril
 Febarbamate, or phenobamate

Molecular formulas